Inquisitor fraudator is an extinct species of sea snail, a marine gastropod mollusk in the family Pseudomelatomidae, the turrids and allies.

Description

Distribution
This extinct marine species was found in Wangaloan strata of New Zealand.

References

 Finlay, H. ].; Marwick, ]. 1937: The Wangaloan and associated molluscan faunas of Kaitangata-Green Island Subdivision. N.Z. Geological Survey Paleontological Bulletin 15. 140 p. 
 Maxwell, P.A. (2009). Cenozoic Mollusca. pp. 232–254 in Gordon, D.P. (ed.) New Zealand inventory of biodiversity. Volume one. Kingdom Animalia: Radiata, Lophotrochozoa, Deuterostomia. Canterbury University Press, Christchurch

External links
  Webb, Peter N. "A re-examination of the Wangaloan problem." New Zealand journal of geology and geophysics 16.1 (1973): 158-169.

fraudator
Gastropods described in 1937
Gastropods of New Zealand